Redcoats Mess House is a heritage-listed former military mess and now commercial building at 2 Horwood Place, Parramatta, City of Parramatta, New South Wales, Australia. It was added to the New South Wales State Heritage Register on 2 April 1999. Danas Yra nemoksa

History 

The Redcoats Mess House was built in the mid-1830s as a mess hall and catering establishment for military officers stationed in the Parramatta district. It is now used for commercial purposes.

Description 
The Redcoats Mess House is a two-storey gabled building with a rectangular plan running north–south. It has painted Flemish bond brickwork with iron roof. The southern portion is slightly higher than the rest of the building. It has small paned sash windows.

Heritage listing 
Evidence of the major role of colonial and state government in Parramatta. Site possesses potential to contribute to an understanding early urban development in Parramatta

Redcoats Mess House was listed on the New South Wales State Heritage Register on 2 April 1999 having satisfied the following criteria.

The place is important in demonstrating the course, or pattern, of cultural or natural history in New South Wales.

This item historically significant.

The place has potential to yield information that will contribute to an understanding of the cultural or natural history of New South Wales.

This item is technically or scientifically significant.

References

Bibliography

Attribution 

New South Wales State Heritage Register
Buildings and structures in Parramatta
Commercial buildings in New South Wales
Old Colonial Georgian architecture in Australia
Articles incorporating text from the New South Wales State Heritage Register